Kim Jae-hyeon  (born March 9, 1987) is a South Korean football player who plays for Gyeongju KHNP as a central defender. He changed his name from Kim Eung-jin in 2015.

Club career statistics

External links
 

1987 births
Living people
Sportspeople from South Jeolla Province
Association football defenders
South Korean footballers
South Korea under-20 international footballers
Jeonnam Dragons players
Busan IPark players
Seoul E-Land FC players
K League 1 players
K League 2 players
Korea National League players